David Alagalak (born 11 April 1944 on Southampton Island, Nunavut) is a Canadian politician, who was the Member of the Legislative Assembly (MLA) for the electoral district of Arviat in the Legislative Assembly of Nunavut from 2004 to 2008.

Prior to becoming an MLA,  Alagalak was mayor of Arviat and served as a board member to several Inuit organizations.

External links
David Alagalak at the Legislative Assembly of Nunavut

1944 births
Living people
Inuit from the Northwest Territories
Inuit politicians
Members of the Legislative Assembly of Nunavut
21st-century Canadian politicians
Mayors of Arviat
Inuit from Nunavut
People from Arviat